Spangler Woods is a Gettysburg Battlefield location used during the Battle of Gettysburg and is near the Virginia Monument. On July 2, 1863, Garnett's Brigade bivouacked on the border of the woods.

References

Gettysburg Battlefield
Forests of Pennsylvania